Associazione Dilettantistica Voluntas Calcio Spoleto (or simply Voluntas Spoleto) is an Italian association football club located in Spoleto, Umbria. They play their home matches at Stadio Comunale with a capacity of 1,500.

History 
The club was founded in 2006 after the bankruptcy of historic team of A.S. Fortis Spoleto F.C. in 1932, just promoted to Serie C2 in the season 2005–06.

The team was promoted to Serie D in the 2009–10 season after an ascent started in Promozione Umbria in the 2006–07 season.

In July 2019, Saudi princess Noura bint Saad bin Abdulaziz Al Saud became the president of the club.

The team finished second in the Eccellenza Umbria 2019–20 season (it). In August 2020, the Saudi president decided to leave the club, and not to register them for the next season.

Colors and badge 
Its colors are white and red.

Notes

References

External links
 Official Site

Football clubs in Italy
Football clubs in Umbria
Association football clubs established in 2006
2006 establishments in Italy